Bradford A. Smith (September 22, 1931 – July 3, 2018) was an American astronomer and an associate of the International Astronomical Union. He was employed by the Voyager program, and discovered the moon Bianca (which orbits Uranus) on January 23, 1986.

Teaching
He was an Associate Professor of Astronomy at New Mexico State University, a Professor at the University of Arizona, and a Research Astronomer at the University of Hawaii.

International space missions
Through his work of astronomy he was a team member or team leader of the imaging subsystems of several US and international space missions. The missions were Mars Mariners 6,7, and 9. Viking, Voyager 1 and 2, and the Soviet Vega and Phobos missions. With the Voyager 2 mission he discovered Bianca.

After
He soon changed his interest to extrasolar planetary systems, investigating circumstellar debris disks as a member of the Hubble Space Telescope NICMOS experiment team. 
Smith has four times been awarded the NASA Medal for Exceptional Scientific Achievement.
He was a member of the IAU Working Group for Planetary System Nomenclature and was Chair of the Task Group for Mars Nomenclature. He died in Santa Fe on July 3, 2018 from complications of myasthenia gravis.

Books 
He has co-written three books:

References

1931 births
2018 deaths
American astronomers
New Mexico State University faculty
University of Arizona faculty